Raymond Salvatore Harmon (born April 7, 1974) is an American artist who works primarily as a painter.

Biography

Born in Jackson, Michigan in 1974, Raymond Salvatore Harmon has lived widely throughout the US (New York City; Savannah, Georgia; Ann Arbor, Michigan; Louisville, Kentucky; Eugene, Oregon, among many other locations). Harmon currently resides in London, UK.

Harmon is a proponent of non-object oriented art. Utilizing architectural scale painting and new media/web based content in coordination with public performance, graffiti style ad bombing, and web-based social engineering.

Harmon paints dominantly on an architectural scale, encompassing multistory building facades, sidewalks and street surfaces which he has referred to as "site specific paint installations". Visually, his work is based in gestural abstracted forms utilizing intensely vibrant colors to alter the public perception of both the architecture and its contextual environment.

Harmon's previous film work is predominately abstract. Compared to experimental film maker Stan Brakhage, Harmon's use of abstract imagery is more directly influenced by the works of Harry Smith.

His work has been presented at numerous galleries and festivals throughout the world including – The Museum of Contemporary Art, Chicago, Unsound Festival – Kraków, Robert Beck Memorial Cinema, Copenhagen International Documentary Festival, Artist Television Access, Chicago Underground Film Festival, Cement Media Festival, Athens International Film Festival, RAW Tempel – Berlin, Axiom Theater, Northwest Film Forum, Ann Arbor Film Festival, and The Horse Hospital, London.

As a record producer Harmon has worked with highly acclaimed artists such as Chicago Underground Trio, Andrew Bird, Jim Baker, Josh Abrams, Rob Mazurek, Kalaparush Maurice McIntyre, as well as collaborated on projects with Alan Licht, David Grubbs, Wolfeyes, the Magik Markers, and Spires that in the Sunset Rise. Additionally, Harmon has performed improvised video with numerous musical groups from a diverse background, including Exploding Star Orchestra, Rob Mazurek, Blood on the Wall, Diplo, Wolf Parade, Chicago Underground Trio, Birth Refusal, Mandarin Movie, Dave Phillips, HATI, Mikrokolektyw, and Jason Forrest.

Timeline

On July 13, 2011, Harmon released his book BOMB: A manifesto of art terrorism via his website.

In May 2012, Harmon announced the Seize Art Fare, which takes place on June 1 in London.

GNOSIS, a solo warehouse exhibition by Harmon opened in London during the 2012 Olympics on July 27, 2012, was featured on Channel 4 News.

A solo exhibition titled META that opened in October 2012 in NYC was shut down the day after it opened by Hurricane Sandy.

In February 2014, Harmon launched a major public paint installation in the Downtown Los Angeles Fashion District. The work MIRAGE features a 35 ft by 130 ft mural incorporating augmented reality software available via his website.

In January 2015, Harmon opened his solo exhibition ACID in London featuring an immersive paint installation.

On 11 November 2015, Harmon held a one night popup exhibition as a fundraiser for his recently announced Beta Culture arts grant.

Works

Exhibitions

Solo shows

"Abstract Numerology" - The Old Dentist, London UK 2015
"ACID" - Imitate Modern Gallery, London, UK 2015
"MIRAGE" - LERATA/Skyline14, Los Angeles, CA 2014
"Keeper of the Gates" - Hackney Wicked, London, UK, 2013
"META" - 199 Chrystie, New York, NY, 2012
"GNOSIS" - Hackney Wicked, London, UK, 2012 
"Dweller on the Threshold" - Secret Project Robot, Brooklyn NY, 2009
"Transcendental Territories" – Inspire Fine Art, Chicago, 2007
"Isolated Instances" – Open End Gallery, Chicago, IL, 2004
"Isolated Instances" – Heaven Gallery, Chicago, IL, 2004
"Oceanographers Closet" – Feitech Gallery, Chicago, IL, 2001
"Dreamlife of Sleeping Buildings" – Cement Media, Eindhoven, Holland, 2001
"Subliminal Scores" – Around the Coyote, Chicago, IL, 2000
"Sprayed On In Light" – Interpretation Media, Chicago, IL, 1997

Group shows

"Κατάσταση/Situation Athina" - IFAC, Athens, Greece 2015
"The Wrong - New Digital Art Biennale" - are byte Gallery "Dystrophies" Pavilion, London, UK 2015
"Light" - Alvarado Gallery, London, UK 2014
"Separation Anxiety II: RELAPSE" - Wall play Gallery, New York, NY 2014
"Carnival of Color" - Imitate Modern Gallery, London UK 2014
"Transmissions" - Galleria Mirada, Ravenna, Italy 2013
"Studio Upstairs" - The Royal Academy of Arts, London, UK 2012
"Stirrings Still" - White Box, New York, NY, 2010
"XD 01. User Experience" - SUDLAB, Naples, Italy, 2010  
"Manifest Destiny" - Urban 15, San Antonio, TX, 2008
Group show - La Eanna Maron, Madrid, Spain, 2007
"Love and Other Difficulties" - Images and Views, Nicosia, Cyprus, 2006 
"Infernal Bridegroom" - Axiom, Houston, TX, 2005
"Third Thursdays" - CHAOS Studios Artspace, Colorado Springs, CO, 2004
Group show - 111 Minna Gallery, San Francisco, CA, 2004
"May Flowers" - 21 Grand, Oakland, CA 2002

Filmography
Sprayed On In Light – 1997
static erosion – 1999
Les Fantones de Lumiere – 2000
Tiny Inconsistencies – 2001
The Koan of Sisyphus – 2001
Unfolding Urban Algorithms – 2001
Six Ways Sideways – 2001
A Map of the City – 2001
ambient light – 2002
Daath – 2002
Fireflies – 2003
Cloud of Unknowing – 2003
The Three Stigmata of Marshall McLuhan – 2003
Resistance – 2004
violet summer – 2004
Reliquary of Light (for Mr. Boyd Lynn) – 2004
YHVH – 2005
Plexus Illuminata – 2005
Tree of Life/Tree of Knowledge – 2006
Elevated – 2006
Colorform – 2006
redlight – 2006
Secrets – 2006
Cornerstone – 2006
Chronicle – 2006
11:11 – 2006
Traces – 2007
Sigils of the Heptameron – 2007
'The Philosopher's Stone – 2008Veve's + Loas – 2007Tactic – 2008Aleister Crowley's Rites of Eleusis – 2008Hecate's Moon – 2008A Story Never Told – 2008Hypnotic Brutality – 2008First Corruption – 2008Colossal Portal – 2008Liber O vel Manus et Sagittae – 2009Language Virus – 2009Chronozone (Dweller on the Threshold) – 2009Der Erlking – 2009Sat Around for Peace – 2009Greyscale – 2010Hadith – 2010Sound in Motion – 2010Dew Point – 2010At Night's End – 2010The Revelations of Maria Sabina – 2010Guerrilla Conditions: A Séance for Antony Balch – 2013

References

Further reading

External links

Harmon's work at Vimeo

Raymond Salvatore Harmon, profile at Independent Exposure''

1974 births
Living people
American artists
Record producers from Michigan